The 1996 FIA 2-Litre World Rally Cup was the fourth season of the FIA 2-Litre World Rally Cup, an auto racing championship recognized by the Fédération Internationale de l'Automobile, running in support of the World Rally Championship.

Season summary

FIA 2-Litre World Rally Cup

See also 
 1996 FIA 2-Litre World Rally Cup at ewrc-results.com

World Rally Championship
FIA 2-Litre World Rally Cup